Springbank might refer to any of the following places:

Springbank, Alberta is a rural suburb of the City of Calgary, Alberta.
Springbank Community High School is a high school located in Springbank, Alberta.
Springbank Hill, Calgary (commonly, Springbank) is a suburban subdivision of the City of Calgary, Alberta.
Calgary/Springbank Airport is a reliever airport and is the second most important airport for the City of Calgary, Alberta.
Springbank Distillery is based in Scotland and produces Scotch Whisky.
Springbank (Old Lyme, Connecticut), listed on the U.S. National Register of Historic Places (NRHP)
Springbank (Roslyn Harbor, New York), also NRHP-listed
Springbank Township, Dixon County, Nebraska
Springbank, an alcoholic drink